Renée Brasseur (27 August 1902 – 26 June 1929) was a Luxembourgian swimmer. She competed in the women's 100 metre backstroke event at the 1924 Summer Olympics.

References

External links
 

1902 births
1929 deaths
Luxembourgian female swimmers
Olympic swimmers of Luxembourg
Swimmers at the 1924 Summer Olympics
Sportspeople from Luxembourg City
Female backstroke swimmers